The International Trust Company Building is an historic office building at 39-47 Milk Street in Boston, Massachusetts. The nine-story masonry-clad building was built in 1892–93 to a design by William Gibbons Preston. It is an early Boston example of the Beaux Arts style, and is structurally an early prototype of the use of skeleton framing. It was enlarged in 1906, to a design by Woodbury & Leighton. It was connected by internal connections to the adjacent Compton Building in 1961, when the two buildings were under common ownership.

The building was designated a Boston Landmark by the Boston Landmarks Commission in 1978. The building was listed on the National Register of Historic Places in 1979.

See also 
 National Register of Historic Places listings in northern Boston, Massachusetts

External links
City of Boston,Boston Landmarks CommissionInternational Trust Study Report

References

Bank buildings on the National Register of Historic Places in Massachusetts
Skyscraper office buildings in Boston
National Register of Historic Places in Boston
Landmarks in Financial District, Boston

Office buildings completed in 1893
Bank buildings in Boston